Candidal onychomycosis is an infection of the nail plate by fungus caused by Candida. In one study Candida parapsilosis was the most common species; Candida albicans is also a common agent.

See also 
 Onychomycosis
 Skin lesion

References 

Mycosis-related cutaneous conditions